Vines Cross is a hamlet in the Wealden district of East Sussex, England. It is 2.7 miles from the market town of Heathfield.

This dormitory village once had a thriving school, bakers, post office, church and grocers, but now only has a public house (The Brewers Arms) and a garage.

References

Villages in East Sussex